Neelavukku Neranja Manasu is a 1958 Indian Tamil-language film directed by K. Somu. It was released on 26 September 1958.

Plot

Cast 
List adapted from the database of Film News Anandan and from film credits.

Male cast
T. R. Ramachandran
Sriram
K. A. Thangavelu
V. K. Ramasamy
P. D. Sambandam
V. M. Ezhumalai
M. R. Santhanam
M. E. Madhavan

Female cast
Pandari Bai
Ragini
M. N. Rajam
T. P. Muthulakshmi
Venubai
Baby Uma

Production 
The film was produced by Dinshaw K. Tehrani, N. Naga Subramaniam and V. S. Venkatachalam under the banner Royal Films. K. Somu directed the film, while A. P. Nagarajan wrote the screenplay and dialogues. Cinematography was directed by Gopanna, while the camera was handled by G. Vittal Rao and by V. R. Subba Rao (for the colour dance sequence). Dinshaw K. Tehrani was in charge of audiography, while the recordings were done by M. Loganathan. K. Vijayarangam and K. Durairaj handled the editing. Art direction was by N. Kuppusamy. Choreography was done by P. S. Gopalakrishnan,  P. C. Thangaraj and Deshmand. The film was shot at Newtone studios and processed at Central Cine Laboratory.

Soundtrack 
Music was composed by K. V. Mahadevan, while the lyrics were penned by A. Maruthakasi and A. S. Narayanan.

References

External links 
 

1950s Tamil-language films
Films directed by K. Somu
Films scored by K. V. Mahadevan
Films with screenplays by A. P. Nagarajan